Gamecock Barracks is a military installation located at Bramcote,  south-east of Nuneaton in Warwickshire.

History
The barracks were established, on the site of the former RAF Bramcote airbase, in 1959: it was called after HMS Gamecock, the name of the naval unit based at the site before the British Army took it over. The Barracks were home to the Junior Leaders' Regiment Royal Artillery, between the 1960s and the 1990s.  This was an Army training establishment for the future non-commissioned officers of the Royal Artillery.  It was one of many different types of Junior establishments for soldiers serving from the age of 15 to 17 years (until the school leaving age was raised to 16).  After completing their military and trade training, which initially took two years, but was latterly reduced to 12 months, they would muster to their designated Regular Army Artillery Regiments.

Current Use
Since 1993 the barracks have been occupied by 30 Signal Regiment.

Future Use
In November 2016, following a review of the defence infrastructure, it was announced that (by 2021) Gamecock Barracks would additionally be home to the following units:
 30 Signal Regiment (remaining in location)
 170 (Infrastructure Support) Engineer Group, Royal Engineers - relocating from Chetwynd Barracks, Chilwell
 HQ 2 Medical Brigade - relocating from Queen Elizabeth Barracks, Strensall
 34 Field Hospital
 Medical Training Facility

Together with Whittington Barracks this would form a West Midlands-based Defence Medical Services centre of excellence.

References

Installations of the British Army
Barracks in England